The Eparchy of Kruševac is one of the eparchies of the Serbian Orthodox Church, with the seat at Kruševac, Serbia.

Church-buildings

References

External links 
 Official site

Serbian Orthodox Church in Serbia
Religious sees of the Serbian Orthodox Church
Rasina District
Christian organizations established in the 13th century
13th century in Serbia
Dioceses established in the 13th century